In molecular biology, glycoside hydrolase family 101 is a family of glycoside hydrolases.

Glycoside hydrolases  are a widespread group of enzymes that hydrolyse the glycosidic bond between two or more carbohydrates, or between a carbohydrate and a non-carbohydrate moiety. A classification system for glycoside hydrolases, based on sequence similarity, has led to the definition of >100 different families. This classification is available on the CAZy web site, and also discussed at CAZypedia, an online encyclopedia of carbohydrate active enzymes.

Glycoside hydrolase family GH101 includes enzymes with endo-α-N-acetylgalactosaminidase  activity and can be split into several subfamilies.

External links 
 GH101 in CAZypedia

References

EC 3.2.1
GH family
Protein domains